Dean Stanley Lesher (August 4, 1903 – May 13, 1993) was an American newspaper publisher, founder of the Contra Costa Times and the Contra Costa Newspapers chain. He was also a well-known philanthropist in the San Francisco Bay Area.

Life
Lesher was born August 4, 1903, the son of Margaret and David Lesher, in Williamsport, Maryland. His first business experience began when he opened a small ice cream stand at the age of 10. When he was 12, he gave that up for a job in a local tannery partially owned by his father. In his high school years Lesher found work as a railroad waybill clerk and was active in sports, playing football, baseball, and soccer.

He attended the University of Maryland, graduating magna cum laude, and proceeded to earn a law degree from Harvard University. 
He was married to Kathryn Lesher who would die of cancer in 1971. He was later remarried to Margaret Lesher until his death in 1993 at the age of 90. In 1997 Margaret Lesher drowned under mysterious circumstances in Bartlett Lake in Arizona while on a camping trip with her husband of six months Collin "T.C." Thorstenson.

Newspapers

Though he had a successful legal practice in Kansas City, Missouri, Lesher grew bored with law and found himself fascinated with newspapers, especially their ability, in his view, to shape and improve a community. Initially, he acquired a small paper in Nebraska but he found no way to generate a profit.

In 1941, at the age of 39 Lesher and his family moved to California where he purchased a small daily, the Merced Sun-Star. While the local economy was booming with the war effort, civilian rationing meant empty store shelves and little to no advertising revenues. Lesher invited some prominent local business owners to dinner and asked them to advertise for the sake of the area paper. In this way, he solidified the paper's financial position.

After the war, Lesher sought other opportunities and found them in Contra Costa County. Shortly after buying the Walnut Creek Journal-Courier in 1947, he renamed it the Contra Costa Times to reflect its growing primacy in the region. Readers of the Times referred to it as "the green sheet" because the cover page was printed on green newsprint. Even though the Times was delivered without a subscription Lesher had his delivery people make a monthly attempt to collect delivery fees from readers. Over time, he purchased other papers in the region and pioneered a series of new subscription tactics including both "controlled circulation" and a gradual shift from free weekly to paid daily papers.

In 1977, the California Press Association awarded Lesher with its Publisher of the Year award. In 1983, President Ronald Reagan presented Lesher with the highest award granted by the National Newspaper Association for distinguished leadership.

Legacy

In 1995, Lesher's heirs sold the papers.  The Contra Costa Times was sold to Knight-Ridder for $365 million. The Merced Sun-Star was sold to USMedia Group.

Firmly committed to the ideals of community and education, Lesher was known for his generous donations of both time and money. He served on the Board of Governors of the California Community College System, and as a trustee of the California State University System, St. Mary's College, and John F. Kennedy University. His mark should be familiar in the Dean and Kathryn Lesher Library at Merced Junior College, the Dean Lesher Regional Center for the Arts in Walnut Creek, California, and the Margaret Lesher Student Union Building of Diablo Valley College.

The Dean & Margaret Lesher Foundation, established in 1989, continues to be administered by Lesher's heirs, and it grants millions of dollars annually for community improvement and educational scholarships.

References

External links
California Newspaper Hall of Fame, Dean Lesher
The Dean & Margaret Lesher Foundation
Dean Lesher Center for the Arts

1993 deaths
American newspaper chain founders
20th-century American newspaper publishers (people)
Businesspeople from the San Francisco Bay Area
University of Maryland, College Park alumni
Harvard Law School alumni
People from Concord, California
1903 births
Journalists from California
20th-century American philanthropists
20th-century American journalists
American male journalists